Quilca District is one of eight districts of the province Camaná in Peru.

References

Districts of the Camaná Province
Districts of the Arequipa Region